Cypress is a common name for various coniferous trees or shrubs of northern temperate regions that belong to the family Cupressaceae. The word cypress is derived from Old French cipres, which was imported from Latin cypressus, the latinisation of the Greek κυπάρισσος (kyparissos).
Cypress trees are a large classification of conifers, encompassing the trees and shrubs from the cypress family (Cupressaceae) and many others with the word “cypress” in their common name. Many cypress trees have needle-like, evergreen foliage and acorn-like seed cones.

Species
Species that are commonly known as cypresses include:
Most prominently:

Cypress (multiple species within the genus Cupressus)

Otherwise:

African cypress (Widdringtonia species), native to Southern Africa
Bald, Pond, and Montezuma cypresses (Taxodium species), native to North America
Chinese swamp cypress (Glyptostrobus pensilis), Vietnam, critically endangered
Cordilleran cypress (Austrocedrus chilensis), native to Chile and Argentina
Cypress-pines (Actinostrobus species), southwestern Australia
Cypress-pines (Callitris species), Australia and New Caledonia
False cypress (Chamaecyparis species), Asia and North America.
Fujian cypress (Fokienia hodginsii), southeastern China
Guaitecas cypress (Pilgerodendron uviferum), western Patagonia and Tierra del Fuego
Japanese cypress (Chamaecyparis obtusa), East Asia
Patagonian cypress (Fitzroya cupressoides), southern Chile and Argentina
Mediterranean cypress (Cupressus sempervirens), famous for its longevity, popular garden plant
Monterey cypress (Cupressus macrocarpa), native to the Monterey Peninsula, California
Nootka cypress (Cupressus nootkatensis), native to the Pacific Northwest of North America
Siberian cypress (Microbiota decussata)
Summer cypress (Bassia scoparia), in the family Amaranthaceae
Western red cedar (Thuja plicata), native to North America.

The family Cupressaceae also contains 13–16 other genera (not listed above) that do not bear cypress in their common names.

See also
 Cypress forest
 Pine-cypress forest
 Hyrcanian forest

References

Cupressaceae
Symbols of Hades